Blennidus is a genus of beetles in the family Carabidae, containing the following species:

 Blennidus aberrans (Straneo, 1985)
 Blennidus amaluzanus Moret, 2005
 Blennidus andinus (Straneo, 1991)
 Blennidus angularis (Straneo, 1985)
 Blennidus antisanae (Bates, 1891)
 Blennidus anxius (Tschitscherine, 1898)
 Blennidus aratus (Solier, 1849)
 Blennidus atahualpa Moret, 1996
 Blennidus aulacostigma (Tschitscherine, 1897)
 Blennidus azurescens Straneo, 1986
 Blennidus balli (Straneo, 1991)
 Blennidus bellator Moret, 2005
 Blennidus bellesi (Straneo, 1993)
 Blennidus bistriatus Straneo, 1951
 Blennidus blairi (Vandyke, 1953)
 Blennidus blandus (Erichson, 1834)
 Blennidus bordoni (Straneo, 1993)
 Blennidus calathoides (G.R.Waterhouse, 1845)
 Blennidus casalei Moret, 2005
 Blennidus catharinianus (Emden, 1949)
 Blennidus chinchillanus Moret, 2005
 Blennidus crassus (Straneo, 1993)
 Blennidus curtatus (Straneo, 1993)
 Blennidus cuzcanus Straneo, 1986
 Blennidus darlingtoni (Straneo, 1951)
 Blennidus davidsoni (Straneo, 1985)
 Blennidus davidsonianus Moret, 2005
 Blennidus dianae Camero, 2006
 Blennidus diminutus (Chaudoir, 1878)
 Blennidus dryas Moret, 1995
 Blennidus duncani (Vandyke, 1953)
 Blennidus ecuadorianus (Straneo, 1991)
 Blennidus egens (Tschitscherine, 1898)
 Blennidus equadoricus (Straneo, 1954)
 Blennidus euphaenops (Tschitscherine, 1898)
 Blennidus ferrugineicornis Motschulsky, 1866
 Blennidus filicornis (Straneo, 1993)
 Blennidus fontainei (Tschitscherine, 1900)
 Blennidus formosus Moret, 1995
 Blennidus foveatus Straneo, 1951
 Blennidus franzanus (Straneo, 1972)
 Blennidus galapagoensis (G.R.Waterhouse, 1845)
 Blennidus gaujoni Moret, 1995
 Blennidus gregarius Moret, 1996
 Blennidus hebes (Tschitscherine, 1898)
 Blennidus idioderus (Tschitscherine, 1898)
 Blennidus inca (Tschitscherine, 1898)
 Blennidus inops (Tschitscherine, 1898)
 Blennidus insularis (Boheman, 1858)
 Blennidus integer (Bates, 1891)
 Blennidus jelskii (Tschitscherine, 1897)
 Blennidus kochalkai (Straneo, 1985)
 Blennidus laevigatus (Straneo, 1951)
 Blennidus laevis (Straneo, 1951)
 Blennidus languens (Tschitscherine, 1898)
 Blennidus laterestriatus (Chaudoir, 1876)
 Blennidus laurentianus Straneo, 1986
 Blennidus leleuporum (Reichardt, 1976)
 Blennidus liodes (Bates, 1891)
 Blennidus longiloba (Straneo, 1993)
 Blennidus marlenae Moret, 1995
 Blennidus marsyasicus (Straneo, 1951)
 Blennidus mateui (Straneo, 1993)
 Blennidus mathani Moret, 1995
 Blennidus mauritii Straneo, 1986
 Blennidus mediolaevis (Chaudoir, 1876)
 Blennidus mesotibialis (Straneo, 1993)
 Blennidus meticulosus (Dejean, 1831)
 Blennidus minor (Straneo, 1993)
 Blennidus minutus (Straneo, 1951)
 Blennidus montanus (Straneo, 1951)
 Blennidus mucronatus Moret, 1996
 Blennidus mutchleri (Vandyke, 1953)
 Blennidus negrei (Straneo, 1993)
 Blennidus nemorivagus Moret, 1995
 Blennidus nigritulus (Straneo, 1993)
 Blennidus obscuripennis (Solier, 1849)
 Blennidus olivaceus (Tschitscherine, 1897)
 Blennidus onorei (Straneo, 1991)
 Blennidus orbicollis (Straneo, 1993)
 Blennidus pachycerus (Tschitscherine, 1897)
 Blennidus parmatus Moret, 1996
 Blennidus parvulus (Solier, 1849)
 Blennidus pascoensis (Straneo, 1954)
 Blennidus peruvianus (Dejean, 1828)
 Blennidus phaenogonus (Tschitscherine, 1898)
 Blennidus pichinchae (Bates, 1891)
 Blennidus planatus (Straneo, 1972)
 Blennidus plaumanni (Emden, 1949)
 Blennidus podocarpi Moret, 1995
 Blennidus poeciloides (Straneo, 1953)
 Blennidus poncei (Straneo, 1991)
 Blennidus pseudoperuvianus Straneo, 1986
 Blennidus quadrilamatus Straneo, 1986
 Blennidus rectangulus (Straneo, 1993)
 Blennidus refleximargo (Straneo, 1993)
 Blennidus robustulus (Straneo, 1954)
 Blennidus rufescens (Solier, 1849)
 Blennidus sanchezi Moret, 2005
 Blennidus sciakyi (Straneo, 1991)
 Blennidus smaragdinus (Straneo, 1951)
 Blennidus solivagus Moret, 2005
 Blennidus somnians (Tschitscherine, 1898)
 Blennidus strictibasis (Straneo, 1991)
 Blennidus striolatus (Straneo, 1951)
 Blennidus subcordatus (Straneo, 1951)
 Blennidus sublaevis (Straneo, 1993)
 Blennidus sublustris (Tschitscherine, 1898)
 Blennidus tardus (Tschitscherine, 1898)
 Blennidus tenenbaumi (Lutshnik, 1927)
 Blennidus thoracatus Moret, 2005
 Blennidus ticlianus (Straneo, 1993)
 Blennidus touzeti Moret, 1996
 Blennidus uniformis (Straneo, 1951)
 Blennidus unistria (Straneo, 1993)
 Blennidus vancuveriensis (Chaudoir, 1878)
 Blennidus vereshaginae (Straneo, 1993)
 Blennidus vignai Moret, 2005
 Blennidus viridans Moret, 1995
 Blennidus waterhousei (Vandyke, 1953)
 Blennidus williamsi (Vandyke, 1953)

References

 
Pterostichinae